In Greek mythology, Munichus (Ancient Greek: Μούνιχος Moúnikhos) may refer to:

Munichus, son of Dryas, king of the Molossians and a seer. He was husband of Lelante and by her father of three sons, Philaeus, Alcander and Megaletor, and of a daughter Hyperippe. Of them Alcander excelled his father in prophetic abilities. The family were just and righteous and therefore especially favored by the gods. One day, raiders attacked them in the fields; the family ran off to their house and began to throw various objects at them in self-defense, whereupon the offenders set fire to the house. Zeus would not let his favorites die such a miserable death and changed them all into birds: Munichus into a buzzard, Lelante into a green woodpecker, Alcander into a wren, Hyperippe into a loon, Megaletor into an "ichneumon" and Philaeus into a "dog-bird".
Munichus or Munychus, son of Panteucles or Pantacles and a king of Athens. He was believed to have been the eponym of the Munichian harbor in Athens and founder of the temple of Artemis Munychia in Peiraeus which he had seized. It was also related that when Orchomenus was invaded by the Thracians, the inhabitants of Orchomenus fled to Munichos who welcomed them, and subsequently named the place where he let them dwell Munichia after the hospitable king. He also appeared in a vase painting alongside other allies of Theseus against the Amazons. A hero cult of him existed, as is evident from an inscription found in Peiraeus that reads: "[name missing], son of Epicharmus, has offered to Munichus".

Notes

References 
Antoninus Liberalis, The Metamorphoses of Antoninus Liberalis translated by Francis Celoria (Routledge 1992). Online version at the Topos Text Project.
Euripides, Hippolytus with an English translation by David Kovacs. Cambridge. Harvard University Press. 1994. Online version at the Perseus Digital Library. Greek text available from the same website.
Publius Ovidius Naso, Metamorphoses translated by Brookes More (1859-1942). Boston, Cornhill Publishing Co. 1922. Online version at the Perseus Digital Library.
Publius Ovidius Naso, Metamorphoses. Hugo Magnus. Gotha (Germany). Friedr. Andr. Perthes. 1892. Latin text available at the Perseus Digital Library.
Realencyclopädie der Classischen Altertumswissenschaft, Band XVI, Halbband 31, Molatzes-Myssi (1933), s. 570
Stephanus of Byzantium, Stephani Byzantii Ethnicorum quae supersunt, edited by August Meineike (1790-1870), published 1849. A few entries from this important ancient handbook of place names have been translated by Brady Kiesling. Online version at the Topos Text Project.
Suida, Suda Encyclopedia translated by Ross Scaife, David Whitehead, William Hutton, Catharine Roth, Jennifer Benedict, Gregory Hays, Malcolm Heath Sean M. Redmond, Nicholas Fincher, Patrick Rourke, Elizabeth Vandiver, Raphael Finkel, Frederick Williams, Carl Widstrand, Robert Dyer, Joseph L. Rife, Oliver Phillips and many others. Online version at the Topos Text Project.
Wilhelm Heinrich Roscher (ed.): Ausführliches Lexikon der griechischen und römischen Mythologie. Band 2. 2 (L-M), Leipzig, 1894–1897. - ss. 3228-3229

Greek mythological heroes
Mythological Greek seers
Metamorphoses into birds in Greek mythology
Kings of Athens
Kings in Greek mythology
Attican characters in Greek mythology
Deeds of Zeus
Epirotic mythology